The Electric Age is the 16th studio album by the American thrash metal band Overkill, which was released on March 27, 2012 in the U.S. on eOne Music and in Europe three days later on Nuclear Blast.

Reception and sales

The album sold about 6,700 copies in the United States during the first week of release, beating the band's first week sales of their previous record, Ironbound, which totalled 4,100 copies. The Electric Age was also the first Overkill album to crack the top 100; the album peaked at #77 on the Billboard 200, making it their third highest chart position in their career (their subsequent albums, White Devil Armory and The Grinding Wheel, peaked at #31 and #69 respectively). In its second week The Electric Age sold 2,950 copies and dropped to #170 on the Billboard 200, bringing the sales total to a little under 10,000 copies.

Track listing

All bonus tracks from Australian Ironbound Tour. These tracks were also released as an EP by the label in 2013.

Credits
Writing, performance and production credits are adapted from the album liner notes.

Personnel
Overkill
 Bobby "Blitz" Ellsworth – lead vocals
 D.D. Verni – bass, backing vocals
 Dave Linsk – lead guitar
 Derek Tailer – rhythm guitar
 Ron Lipnicki – drums

Production
 Overkill – production
 Greg Reely – mixing, mastering
 D.D. Verni, Dave Linsk – engineering
 Jon "Jonnyrod" Ciorciari – recording (at JRod Productions)
 Dave Linsk – recording (at SKH Recording Studios)
 Dan Korneff – editing
 Rob Shallcross – additional editing

Artwork and design
 Travis Smith – cover art, layout
 Mark Weiss – photography

Studios
 Gear Recording Studio, Shrewsbury, New Jersey – recording
 JRod Productions, Pomona, New York – additional recording
 SKH Recording Studios, Stuart, Florida – additional recording

Charts

References

External links
 
  The Electric Age at Nuclear Blast

2012 albums
Nuclear Blast albums
Overkill (band) albums